Crespi (the Italian form of "Crispus") is a surname. Notable people with the surname include:

Benedetto Crespi (d. 725 AD), archbishop of Milan
Consuelo Crespi (1928–2010), model and editor of Vogue Italia
Cristoforo Benigno Crespi (1833–1920), Italian entrepreneur who founded the factory and village of Crespi d’Adda
Daniele Crespi (1590–1630), Italian painter
Domenico Passignano (born Cresti or Crespi) (1559–1636), Italian painter
Frank Angelo Joseph Creepy Crespi (1918–1990), American Major League Baseball player
Giovanni Battista Crespi called Il Cerano (1573–1632), Italian painter, sculptor, and architect
Giulia Maria Crespi (1923–2020), Italian media proprietor
Giuseppe Maria Crespi, called Lo Spagnuolo (1665–1747), Bolognese genre painter of the Baroque period
Juan Crespí  (1721–1782), Spanish missionary and explorer in California
Martí Crespí (born 1987), Spanish footballer

Fictional characters:
Martina Crespi, character from the anime/manga Strike Witches

See also
Crespi d’Adda, a workers’ village on the river Adda between Milan and Bergamo
Crespi Carmelite High School, an all-male Catholic high school in Encino, California

See also
Crispus (disambiguation)

Italian-language surnames
Spanish-language surnames